Angola competed at the 2020 Summer Olympics in Tokyo. Originally scheduled to take place from 24 July to 9 August 2020, the Games were postponed to 23 July to 8 August 2021, because of the COVID-19 pandemic. It was the nation's tenth appearance at the Summer Olympics, having appeared in every Games since 1980 with the exception of the 1984 Summer Olympics in Los Angeles, when it was part of the Soviet boycott.

Competitors
The following is the list of number of competitors in the Games. Note that reserves in handball are not counted:

Athletics

Angola received a universality slot from the World Athletics to send a male athlete to the Olympics.

Track & road events

Handball

Summary

Women's tournament

Angola women's handball team qualified for the Olympics by winning the gold medal at the 2019 African Qualification Tournament in Dakar, Senegal.

Team roster

Group play

Judo
 
Angola qualified one judoka for the women's lightweight category (57 kg) at the Games. Diassonema Mucungui accepted a continental berth from Africa as the nation's top-ranked judoka outside of direct qualifying position in the IJF World Ranking List of June 28, 2021.

Sailing

Angolan sailors qualified a boat in each of the following classes through the class-associated World Championships and the continental regattas.

M = Medal race; EL = Eliminated – did not advance into the medal race

Swimming

Angola received a universality invitation from FINA to send two top-ranked swimmers (one per gender) in their respective individual events to the Olympics, based on the FINA Points System of June 28, 2021.

References

External links
 Angola at the 2020 Summer Olympics at Olympedia

Nations at the 2020 Summer Olympics
2020
2021 in Angolan sport